The Brazil International is the most important international open badminton tournament of Brazil. It is held since the year 1984. Brazilian National Badminton Championships started in 1991. It is part of the BWF International Series.

Past winners

International Challenge

International Series

Future Series

Performances by nation

References

Badminton tournaments in Brazil
Sports competitions in Brazil
Recurring sporting events established in 1984